This is a list of British television related events from 1994.

Events

January
1 January – In the early hours of the morning, BBC2 airs the first Hootenanny which began late the previous evening. The annual New Year's Eve music show is hosted by Jools Holland and the first edition includes performances from Sting, the Gipsy Kings and Sly and Robbie.
2 January – BBC2 begins a repeat run of the 1960s US series The Fugitive.
3 January – The network television premiere of the James Bond film Licence to Kill on ITV, starring Timothy Dalton.
4 January 
Sky One moves E Street back to the 6:30pm weekday timeslot with the afternoon repeat shown the following day at 12:30pm, while Paradise Beach moves to 6pm and 12pm, thus creating an "Aussie Soap Hour" on the channel.
Debut of the military comedy-drama All Quiet on the Preston Front on BBC1.
The children's animated series Budgie the Little Helicopter, based upon a series of books by Sarah, Duchess of York makes its debut on CITV. 
5 January – The Empath, an episode of the US sci-fi series Star Trek is shown for the first time in the UK on BBC2, having not been seen on British television since the series original run on BBC1.
7 January 
The Times reports that merger talks between Yorkshire Television and Tyne Tees have collapsed because it had proved impossible to reach an agreement on a suitable structure for the new company. Also, Anglia have withdrawn from the proposed alliance with London Weekend Television, making an LWT take over of YTV impossible.
ZZZap! returns for a new series on ITV with a new character called Daisy Dares You, played by Deborah McCallum, taking over the part of Tricky Dicky and Smart Arty's segments have been updated with him using a magic pen to draw pictures that come to life.
8 January – The US sci-fi series The New Adventures of Superman makes its UK debut on BBC1, starring Dean Cain and Teri Hatcher.
10 January 
The Welsh language soap opera Pobol y Cwm makes its debut in the rest of the UK when BBC2 begins airing episodes daily from Mondays to Thursdays. The series was, shown with English subtitles, aired on BBC2 for three months, and on an experimental basis.
The classic children's series Rainbow is relaunched with a new format, made by Tetra Films by for HTV. However, the new series is not well received and is axed a year later. 
13 January – David Dimbleby takes over as host of Question Time on BBC1.
14 January – An episode of the Channel 4 soap Brookside shows a lesbian kiss between two of its characters.
16 January – The first episode of the archeology series Time Team is broadcast on Channel 4, presented by Tony Robinson. 
19 January – Whom Gods Destroy, an episode of the US sci-fi TV series Star Trek, is shown on BBC2 for the first time in the UK having not been seen on British television since the series original run on BBC1.
20 January – BBC1 airs an edition of Question Time from Birmingham which includes a confrontation between Jeffrey Archer and David Starkey over the age of homosexual consent.
27 January – The popular sitcom Absolutely Fabulous returns for a second series, now being shown on BBC1. 
January – TCI acquires a 60.4% stake in Flextech. This gives the company a 25% stake in UK Gold.

February
4 February – Following a review of the broadcasting ban conducted by Heritage Secretary Peter Brooke the Major government decides to maintain the status quo.
7 February – Granada Television increases its takeover bid for London Weekend Television to £774 million. However, the LWT board once again rejects the offer. 
12 February – The light entertainment series Don't Forget Your Toothbrush makes its debut on Channel 4, presented by Chris Evans. 
12–27 February – The BBC provides live and recorded coverage of the 1994 Winter Olympic Games. The majority of the coverage is shown on BBC2. 
19 February – The Independent reports that Anglia has been bought by MAI (owners of Meridian). MAI subsequently merges with United Newspapers to form United News and Media.
20 February – Debut of the children's consumer affairs series Short Change on BBC1. 
25 February – LWT accepts a £770 million takeover bid from Granada, resulting in the departure of Greg Dyke and Sir Christopher Bland from the broadcaster.
28 February – The game show Talking Telephone Numbers makes its debut on ITV, presented by Phillip Schofield and Emma Forbes. 
February 
The ITC decides to readvertise the Channel 5 broadcasting licence, but must first seek confirmation that the frequencies it planned to allocate to the channel are still available.
Pages from Ceefax broadcasts adopt the Level 2 teletext graphics. The change sees a significant expansion to the number of pages shown and title pages for each section return. However, the new expanded Pages from Ceefax broadcasts are confined to the 15 minutes prior to the start of programmes which often isn't sufficient time to show the entire sequence which is now between 40 and 50 pages in length.

March
4 March – The network television premiere of Laurel Avenue on BBC2, the acclaimed US miniseries that tells the story of an eventful weekend in the lives of an extended African American family living in St. Paul, Minnesota. The second part is shown on 6 March.
5 March – The network television premiere of David Cronenberg's 1986 horror remake The Fly on ITV, starring Jeff Goldblum, Geena Davis and John Getz.
17 March – Robbie Williams and Mark Owen of Take That present an edition of Top of the Pops, becoming the first in a line of celebrities to guest present the show between 1994 and 1996 under the banner of The golden mic.
18 March – The game show Play Your Cards Right returns to ITV after a seven-year break, with returning host Bruce Forsyth.
25 March – Lynne Perrie makes her final appearance as Coronation Street battleaxe Ivy Tilsley. The press later speculates that Perrie's decision to have plastic surgery without consulting her bosses was the reason for her departure, though Perrie denied this, insisting that she felt that her character had simply run its course. Ivy's death occurs off-screen the following year.

April
2 April – Chris Evans opens the Easter Saturday edition of Don't Forget Your Toothbrush with the words "It’s that time of the year again when we remembered Jesus was crucified and it’s that time of the week when we remember that Spurs probably have been too". The comments attract a complaint to the Broadcasting Standards Commission which is subsequently upheld by the watchdog.
7 April – BBC Scotland makes history by televising a criminal trial as part of its Focal Point strand.
9 April – The three-part adaptation of the Reginald Hill novel A Pinch of Snuff makes its debut on ITV, starring Gareth Hale and Norman Pace in the roles of detectives Dalziel and Pascoe. The series is shown over three consecutive Saturdays, but Hill is reported to be unhappy with the programme and prevents ITV from making any further series. In 1996, the BBC approaches Hill to make its own Dalziel and Pascoe series with Warren Clarke and Colin Buchanan in the leading roles, something to which Hill agrees.
10 April – The network television premiere of Martin Scorsese's 1990 American gangster thriller Goodfellas on Channel 4, starring Robert De Niro, Ray Liotta, Joe Pesci, Lorraine Bracco and Paul Sorvino.
11 April – BBC1 introduces a third weekly episode of EastEnders which airs on Mondays at 8pm.
12 April – Paula Tilbrook makes her debut in Emmerdale as long-serving character Betty Eagleton. 
14 April  – Meat Loaf guest presents an edition of Top of the Pops. 
16 April – BBC2 celebrates its 30th birthday four days early with an evening of programmes selected and introduced by former controller David Attenborough. Among them are episodes of Elizabeth R and The Barry Humphries Show, a 1967 documentary about politics in India and a new episode of Call My Bluff.
18 April – The game show Blockbusters is relaunched on Sky One. 
20 April – The popular US sitcom Frasier makes its UK debut on Channel 4. 
30 April – Ireland's Paul Harrington and Charlie McGettigan win the 1994 Eurovision Song Contest with Rock 'n' Roll Kids.

May
2 May – BBC2 airs Cry Freedom, Richard Attenborough's acclaimed film about South African journalist Donald Woods.
3 May – Channel 4 starts airing Brookside on Tuesdays instead of Mondays which means the soap is now seen on Tuesdays, Wednesdays and Fridays.
5 May – Sky One airs the 100th episode of The Simpsons.
10 May – The launch of BBC Worldwide.
12 May 
The European Commission of Human Rights rejects a legal challenge brought by the National Union of Journalists seeking to take the British government to court for breach of freedom of expression under the European Convention of Human Rights over the broadcast ban.
The death of Labour Party leader and Leader of the Opposition John Smith who suffered a fatal heart attack. That evening's edition of the BBC Nine O'Clock News is extended to an hour, meaning the following programme due to air at 9:30pm and coincidentally called Cardiac Arrest is postponed. Panellists on the evening's edition of Question Time, include George Robertson and Menzies Campbell as they depart from the usual political debate to pay tribute to Smith.
23 May – The BBC2 youth strand DEF II comes to an end after six years.
25 May – The game show Wipeout, created by Bob Fraser makes its debut on BBC1, presented Paul Daniels.  
30 May – Release of the Comic Relief single Absolutely Fabulous by the Pet Shop Boys, named for the popular sitcom of the same name. The song reaches number six on the UK Singles Chart.

June
3 June – The original airdate of an episode of Have I Got News for You in which panellist Ian Hislop was suffering from appendicitis during recording. Having spent most of that day in hospital awaiting treatment, he temporarily discharged himself to record the episode, before returning to undergo surgery.
5–10 June – Sue Lawley presents News '44, a series of news bulletin-style programmes to mark the 50th anniversary of D-Day.
6 June 
Due to a failed satellite link, BBC1 is unable to broadcast a remembrance concert marking the 50th anniversary of D-Day. Instead, it is forced to show recorded highlights of D-Day commemoration events and a repeated Wildlife on One documentary about racoons. The concert, featuring Dame Vera Lynn and other stars from the QE2 off the Normandy port of Cherbourg, is recorded and shown three days later.
The Scottish actor Mark McManus, best known for his portrayal of Glaswegian detective Jim Taggart dies. The Taggart series continues following his death.
12 June – The Independent on Sunday reports that Cable & Wireless are in the final stages of establishing a television service in the remote British Overseas Territory of Saint Helena, a nation that has not previously had access to television. Because of this, the introduction of television to the island is to be the subject of a study by British psychologist Dr. Tony Charlton of Cheltenham and Gloucester College of Higher Education to determine its effects on the island's culture and way of life. 
17 June–17 July – The 1994 FIFA World Cup takes place but the BBC and ITV only show group stage matches in highlight form with viewers having to tune in to satellite channel Eurosport to see live coverage of those games.
18 June – The final episode of The Paul Daniels Magic Show is broadcast on BBC1 after fifteen years on the air. 
19 June – The final episode of the long-running magazine programme That's Life!, presented by Esther Rantzen is broadcast on BBC1 after twenty one years on the air.
20 June – The BBC's Arabic television service is launched with funding from the Saudi Arabian Mawarid Group.
21 June – BBC1 begins its Daily Detective season, a short season of episodes from 1980s US detective series. The first programme is an episode from Remington Steele with Pierce Brosnan and Stephanie Zimbalist. The season also includes episodes from Cagney & Lacey, aired on Mondays, Remington Steele on Tuesdays, Quincy on Wednesdays, Charlie's Angels on Thursdays and Moonlighting on Fridays. The season ends with Moonlighting on 30 September.
29 June – ITV airs the 150-minute documentary Charles: The Private Man, the Public Role about Prince Charles, and presented by Jonathan Dimbleby.

July
1 July – Launch of the BBC's Japanese News and Information Service.
3 July – Gerry Goldwyre wins the 1994 series of MasterChef on BBC1. 
4 July – Debut of the comedy panel show Room 101 on BBC2, presented by Nick Hancock. 
6 July – Channel 4 moves into its new headquarters at 124 Horseferry Road, London.
11 July – Following the death of Dennis Potter in June, BBC1 begins reshowing his television play The Singing Detective.
12 July – To coincide with the 2,000th episode of Neighbours, BBC1 airs Ramsay Street Revisited, an omnibus of the first five episodes of the soap from 1985.
14 July 
Stephen Dorrell, the Secretary of State for Heritage, announces that Channel 35, one of the two frequencies planned for use by a fifth channel, will not be available. The ITC expresses concern over this, but still views Channel 5 as a viable option since 60% of the UK will still be covered by the remaining frequency.
BBC1 airs Episode 1000 of EastEnders and Episode 2000 of Neighbours.
16 July 
John Finch, performing as Marti Pellow wins the fifth series of Stars in Their Eyes on ITV.
Debut of the game show Pets Win Prizes on BBC1, presented by Danny Baker and later Dale Winton. 
24 July – Debut of the game show Small Talk on BBC1, presented by Ronnie Corbett.

August
6 August – BBC1 screens part one of the two-part Hammer Horror documentary: Flesh and Blood, narrated by Christopher Lee and Peter Cushing. The second part is aired on 13 August.
11 August – Frazer Hines makes his final appearance in Emmerdale.
11–12 August – BBC1 airs a two-part adaptation of the Stephen King novel It.
14 August – Debut of Junior MasterChef on BBC1, presented by Loyd Grossman. 
18–28 August – The BBC broadcasts coverage of the 1994 Commonwealth Games from Victoria, Canada. Only the athletics events are show live with all other sports, including swimming, restricted to highlights.
19 August – Sky Sports 2 launches, initially as a weekend-only service.
22 August – The network television premiere of Graham Baker's 1988 science fiction thriller Alien Nation on ITV, starring James Caan, Mandy Patinkin and Terence Stamp.
27 August – BBC2 presents a night of programming dedicated to ATV.

September
3 September – The network television premiere of Terminator 2: Judgment Day on BBC1, starring Arnold Schwarzenegger, Edward Furlong, Robert Patrick and Linda Hamilton.
5 September 
Sky One moves E Street to a 7pm weekday timeslot.
The Children's BBC idents receive a refresh with new 3D graphics. 
7 September – Debut of Police Camera Action!, then known as Police Stop! on ITV, presented by Alastair Stewart. 
8 September – BBC1 airs the first edition of 999 Lifesavers, the sister show to 999.
11 September – The network television premiere of Tim Burton's 1990 American romantic fantasy Edward Scissorhands on Channel 4, starring Johnny Depp, Winona Ryder, Dianne Wiest, Anthony Michael Hall, Alan Arkin and Vincent Price.
14 September – The fantasy drama The Wanderer makes its debut on Sky One, starring Bryan Brown, Tony Haygarth, Kim Thomson and Otto Tausig. Every episode brings a new adventure about the story of long-ago brothers slowly unfolds to the present-day which searches for the original grave, a magic stone and a lost book of power. The series continues on 7 December.
15 September – The ITC announces its decision to readvertise the Channel 5 licence. 
16 September – The restrictions that prevents radio and television broadcasting the voices of members of some Irish political and military groups are lifted in the wake of the Provisional IRA's ceasefire declaration.
17 September – BBC2 airs the first edition of Top of the Pops 2, a spin-off showing footage from present day editions of Top of the Pops as well as material from the series archive.
19 September 
Release of The Cranberries single "Zombie", a song written about the 1993 IRA bombing in Warrington. The video is banned by the BBC because it contains images from the Troubles, instead they broadcast an edited version that focuses on the band's performance footage.
The US science-fiction drama series The X-Files makes its UK debut on BBC2, starring David Duchovny and Gillian Anderson. 
21 September – University Challenge returns after a seven-year absence and two years after a special edition was shown, the revived series on BBC2 is presented by Jeremy Paxman.
22 September – BBC1 airs the Inside Story documentary Silent Twin – Without My Shadow, a film about June and Jennifer Gibbons, identical twins who became known as "The Silent Twins" because they only communicated with each other.
26 September – The network television premiere of Gremlins 2: The New Batch on ITV, starring Zach Galligan and Phoebe Cates. 
27 September – The comedy sketch series The Fast Show makes its debut on BBC2. 
29 September – Chris Evans presents his final edition of The Big Breakfast on Channel 4 after two years as one of the show's original presenters which coincided with the second anniversary of the series.

October
3 October –  Two new channels, Sky Soap and Sky Real Lives, then known as Sky Travel, go on the air. 
5 October – The children's arts and crafts series SMart makes its debut on BBC1. 
6 October 
The Central-produced soap Revelations makes its debut on ITV, a series about a clergyman and his family written by Russell T. Davies. The show which was only aired in some ITV regions ran for two series and featured Davies' first gay character, a lesbian vicar named Joan, played by Sue Holderness who comes out during a two-hander episode with another female character.
The children's series Brum returns for a new series on BBC1.
9 October – Debut of Seaforth, an epic love story beginning in World War II Yorkshire, starring Linus Roache and Lia Williams. The series concludes on 4 December.
10 October – Launch of the UK version of the music channel VH1. 
17 October – The Morning on BBC1, a new weekday morning schedule of magazine, chat and entertainment programmes introduced by Mo Dutta, begins airing. The lineup includes Good Morning with Anne and Nick.
21 October – The network television premiere of Ron Howard's 1991 action thriller Backdraft on BBC1, starring Kurt Russell and William Baldwin.
24 October 
The Sharongate storyline in EastEnders, centred around the character of Sharon Mitchell, played by Letitia Dean, reaches its conclusion. The episode is watched by 25.3 million viewers.
Debut of the cookery competition Ready Steady Cook on BBC2, presented by Fern Britton. 
25 October – Fireman Sam returns to BBC1 with a new series, running for eight episodes.
28 October – The US sitcom Ellen makes its UK debut on Channel 4, starring Ellen DeGeneres. 
29 October – The network television premiere of the 1987 dystopian action thriller The Running Man on ITV, starring Arnold Schwarzenegger, Maria Conchita Alonso, Richard Dawson, Yaphet Kotto and Jesse Ventura.

November
1 November – A second attempt to license the fifth terrestrial channel begins.
4 November 
Leslie Crowther announces his retirement from showbusiness.
The network television premiere of Martin Scorsese's 1991 American suspense thriller remake Cape Fear on BBC1, starring Robert De Niro, Nick Nolte, Jessica Lange and Juliette Lewis, as well as Robert Mitchum, Gregory Peck and Martin Balsam who reprise their roles from the original 1962 version.
7 November – Barbara Windsor makes her EastEnders debut as Peggy Mitchell. The character had previously been played briefly by Jo Warne in 1991.
10 November 
To coincide with the 20th anniversary of the disappearance of Lord Lucan following the murder of his children's nanny, ITV airs The Trial of Lord Lucan, a production by Granada which sees a fictional dramatization of how a trial against the peer might proceed.
The hugely popular sitcom The Vicar of Dibley makes its debut on BBC1, starring Dawn French as the vicar Geraldine Granger.
11 November 
The BBC apologises after its Ceefax service mistakenly reports the death of the Queen Mother. The item, described as a rehearsal script, is on screen for 30 seconds before being removed. The Queen Mother died on 30 March 2002.
The final episode of the children's adventure game show Knightmare is broadcast on ITV. 
13 November – Katie Targett-Adams wins the 1994 series of Junior MasterChef on BBC1. 
16 November – The network television premiere of Paul Verhoeven's 1992 American erotic thriller Basic Instinct on ITV, starring Michael Douglas and Sharon Stone. It is watched by 7.35 million viewers.
17 November – The final episode of the fourth series of Fireman Sam is broadcast on BBC1. It is also the final episode animated by Bumper Films and narrated by John Alderton.
18 November – Debut of The Trial, a series of documentaries aired on BBC2 which were filmed largely inside Scottish courts in 1993 and early 1994. Filming of the series is possible because of the Criminal Justice Act 1925, the legislation banning photography in British courts does not apply in Scotland.
19 November – The first National Lottery draw is broadcast on BBC1, presented by Noel Edmonds.
20 November 
The US series The Young Indiana Jones Chronicles makes its UK debut on BBC1. It initially aired on Sunday afternoons before switching to an early Saturday evening slot from January 1995.
The original airdate of the Everyman episode Portrait of a Serial Killeron BBC1 in which Lionel Dahmer talks about discovering his son, Jeffrey Dahmer was a serial killer.
26 November – BBC1 shows the documentary Girl Friday in which Joanna Lumley spends nine days on a desert island with just a basic survival kit and a film crew.

December
3 December – Comedian Larry Grayson makes his final television appearance at the Royal Variety Performance, recorded on 28 November. He had been absent from television for some years and made a reference to this during his act, commenting to the audience, "They thought I was dead!". He died a month later. 
17 December – BBC2 begins a season of films starring Burt Lancaster following his death in October which opens with Elmer Gantry, a 1960 film in which he stars alongside Jean Simmons.
20 December – The final episode of the animated children's series The Raggy Dolls is broadcast on ITV. 
23 December – BBC1 airs Simply Red – Live, a concert given by the band in their home town of Manchester.
24 December – The final episode of The Generation Game presented by Bruce Forsyth is broadcast on BBC1, Jim Davidson would succeed him the following year.
25 December 
Christmas Day highlights on BBC1 include the network television premieres of the animated film Jetsons: The Movie and the 1991 action adventure blockbuster Robin Hood: Prince of Thieves, starring Kevin Costner as Robin Hood and Alan Rickman as the Sheriff of Nottingham.
The network television premiere of Walt Disney's 1959 animated musical fantasy classic Sleeping Beauty on ITV for the first time.
ITV airs its first Christmas episode of Heartbeat called A Winter's Tale. 
29 December 
The final episode in the original run of the children's series Brum is broadcast on BBC1, but the show will return with a revamped series in 2001 and will continue being repeated on the BBC. It is also Toyah Willcox's final episode as the narrator for the series.
The network television premiere of In Bed with Madonna, a film following the singer Madonna during her 1990 Blonde Ambition Tour which was broadcast on BBC2.
The final episode of the game show Strike It Lucky is broadcast on ITV, it would be relaunched in 1996 under the name of Strike It Rich. 
31 December 
New Year's Eve highlights on BBC1 include Barbra Streisand – The Concert, a performance given by the singer at Ponds, California earlier in the year.
New Year's Eve highlights on BBC2 include Plague and the Moonflower, a musical drama about the human race's abuse of the planet. There is also a special end-of-year edition of TOTP2 featuring highlights of the Christmas Day edition of Top of the Pops.

Debuts

BBC1
 2 January 
A Dark-Adapted Eye (1994)
 4 January 
 All Quiet on the Preston Front (1994–1997)
 Teddy Trucks (1994)
 8 January 
Eek! The Cat (1992–1997)
The New Adventures of Superman (1993–1997)
 30 January – Incredible Games (1994–1995)
 17 February 
 Nelson's Column (1994–1995)
 Mud (1994–1995)
 20 February – Short Change (1994–2005)
 23 February – Earthfasts (1994)
 13 March 
 Honey for Tea (1994)
Pie in the Sky (1994–1997)
 14 March – Men of the World (1994–1995)
 20 March – Ain't Misbehavin' (1994–1995)
 24 March – Grushko (1994)
 7 April 
Secret Life of Toys (1994)
The House of Gristle (1994)
 21 April – Cardiac Arrest (1994–1996)
 27 April – The Lifeboat  (1994)
 25 May – Wipeout (1994–2003)
 11 June – Fair Game (1994)
 12 June – Love on a Branch Line (1994)
 16 June – Roughnecks (1994–1995)
 7 July – The Imaginatively Titled Punt & Dennis Show (1994–1995)
 11 July – All Night Long (1994)
 12 July – Chandler & Co (1994–1995)
 16 July – Pets Win Prizes (1994–1996)
 23 July – SWAT Kats: The Radical Squadron (1993–1994)
 24 July – Small Talk (1994–1996)
 27 July – The Human Animal (1994)
 31 July – The Tales of Para Handy (1994–1995)
 14 August – The Great Antiques Hunt (1994–2000)
 29 August – Animal Hospital (1994–2004)
 7 September – Common as Muck (1994–1997)
 8 September – 999 Lifesavers (1994–1998) 
 12 September – Monster Cafe (1994–1995)
 18 September – Paul Merton's Palladium Story (1994)
 26 September – Nice Day at the Office (1994)
 28 September – Dino Babies (1994–1996)
 6 October – Pirates (1994–1997)
 25 October 
 William's Wish Wellingtons (1994–1996)
 4 November – Harry Enfield and Chums (1994–1999)
 10 November 
The Vicar of Dibley (1994–2007)
Crocodile Shoes (1994)
 13 November – Just William (1994–1995)
 19 November – The National Lottery Draws (1994–2017)
 20 November – The Young Indiana Jones Chronicles (1992–1993)
 27 November – A Mind to Kill (1994–2004)
 11 December – The Wimbledon Poisoner (1994)

BBC2
6 January – The All New Alexei Sayle Show (1994–1995)
9 January – The High Life (1994–1995)
11 January – Look and Read: Earth Warp (1994)
12 January – Middlemarch (1994)
19 January – The Day Today (1994)
4 March – Laurel Avenue (1993)
8 May 
Fievel's American Tails (1992)
Watergate (1994)
30 June – The Bots Master (1993–1994)
4 July – Room 101 (1994–2007)
12 July – Floyd on Fish (1994)
27 July – Stages (Anthology series) (1994)
11 September – Bay City (1993)
16 September – Knowing Me Knowing You with Alan Partridge (1994–1995)
17 September – Top of the Pops 2 (1994–present)
19 September 
Working Lunch (1994–2010)
The X-Files (1993–2002, 2016–present)
21 September – The Big Trip Travel show (1994–present)
27 September – The Fast Show (1994–1997, 2000)
9 October – The Busy World of Richard Scarry (1994–1997)
21 October – Young Jung (1994)
24 October – Ready Steady Cook (1994–2010)
6 November – Stone Protectors (1993)
7 November – Martin Chuzzlewit (1994)

ITV
 4 January – Budgie the Little Helicopter (1994–1996)
 5 January – 99-1 (1994–1995)
 7 January – The Magic House (1994–1996)
 10 January – Under the Hammer (1994)
 12 January – Terror Towers (1994–1996)
 14 January – Fantasy Football League (1994–1996, 1998, 2004)
 17 January – Law and Disorder (1994)
 6 February – Dandelion Dead (1994)
 24 February – Animaniacs (1993–1998)
 27 February – Anna Lee (1994)
 28 February – Talking Telephone Numbers (1994–1997)
 18 March – Chris Cross (1994–1995)
 24 March – Outside Edge (1994–1996)
 7 April 
Stanley's Dragon (1994)
Class Act (1994–1995)
 9 April – A Pinch of Snuff (1994)
 10 April – The Knock (1994–2000)
 17 April – The Cinder Path (1994)
 13 May – Vanessa (1994–1998)
 15 May – The House of Windsor (1994)
 26 May – Moving Story (1994–1995)
 29 May – Cadfael (1994–1998)
 31 May – Halfway Across the Galaxy and Turn Left (1994–1995) (Made in 1992)
 13 June – Dr. Zitbag's Transylvania Pet Shop (1994–1997)
 15 July 
Arthur C. Clarke's Mysterious Universe (1994–1995)
Body Heat (1994–1996)
 20 July – The Ink Thief (1994)
 21 July – Downwardly Mobile (1994)
 23 July – Scavengers (1994–1995)
 24 July – Wycliffe (1994–1998)
 19 August – Which Way to the War (1994)
 7 September 
 Police Camera Action! (1994–2008)
 Faith (1994)
 14 September – The Wanderer (1994)
 22 September – Magic Adventures of Mumfie (1994)
 6 October – Revelations (1994–1996)
 1 November – Ky’s Cartoons (1994–1999)
 12 November – Open Fire (1994)
 17 November – Finney (1994)
 25 December – Mole's Christmas (1994)
 Unknown 
The Little Mermaid (1992–1994)
Aladdin (1994–1995)

Channel 4
11 January – Karachi Kops
15 January – NYPD Blue (1993–2005)
16 January – Time Team (1994–2014)
12 February – Don't Forget Your Toothbrush (1994–1995)
9 April – Emily's Ghost (1994)
20 April – Frasier (1993–2004)
16 May – Babylon 5 (1993–1998)
29 May – The Odyssey (1992–1994)
7 June – Little Napoleons (1994)
30 July – The People's Parliament (1994–1999)
3 August – Biker Mice from Mars (1993–1996 Channel 4, 2006–2007 CITV)
12 August – The World of Hammer (1994)
14 October – Paris (1994)
28 October – Ellen (1994–1998)
9 November – A Man You Don't Meet Every Day (1994)
27 December – The Mousehole Cat (1994)

Sky One
3 April – Highlander: The Series (1992–1998)
23 April – Kung Fu: The Legend Continues (1993–1997)
9 May – She-Wolf of London (1990–1991)
18 May – Angel Falls (1993)
28 June –The First Circle (1992)
14 September 
One West Waikiki (1994–1996)
The Wanderer (1994)
2 October – Duckman (1994–1997)
3 October 
Spellbound (1994–1996)
Space Precinct (1994–1995)
13 November – A Mind to Kill (1994–2002)
14 December – Scarlett (1994)

Channels

New channels

Television shows

Changes of network affiliation

Returning this year after a break of one year or longer
10 January – The new version of Rainbow (1972–1992, 1994–1997)
27 January – Ben Elton: The Man from Auntie (1990; 1994)
18 March  – Play Your Cards Right (1980–1987, 1994–1999, 2002–2003)
18 April – Blockbusters (1983–1993, 1994–1995, 1997, 2000–2001, 2012, 2019)
5 September – The Russ Abbot Show (1980–1985; 1986–1991; 1994–1996)
21 September – University Challenge (1962–1987 ITV, 1994–present BBC)

Ending this year
 That's Life! (1973–1994)
 Jim'll Fix It (1975–1994)
 The Paul Daniels Magic Show (1979–1994)
 Postman Pat (1981, 1991–1994, 1996, 2004–2008)
 The Adventures of Sherlock Holmes (1984–1994)
 Lovejoy (1986–1994)
 The Raggy Dolls (1986–1994)
 Fireman Sam (1987–1994, 2003–2013)
 Knightmare (1987–1994)
 The New Statesman (1987–1994)
 Desmond's (1989–1994)
 Waiting for God (1990–1994)
 The House of Eliott (1991–1994)
 Brum (1991–1994, 2001–2002)
 Anna Lee (1993–1994)
 Avenger Penguins (1993–1994)
 Rubbish, King of the Jumble (1993–1994)
 Under the Hammer (1994)
 Faith (1994)
 Paul Merton's Palladium Story (1994)
 The Wimbledon Poisoner (1994)

Births
 23 June – Jamie Borthwick, actor
 28 June – Madeline Duggan, actress
 6 July – Camilla and Rebecca Rosso, actress and singers
 24 October – Kit Young, actor
 14 December – Kedar Williams-Stirling, actor

Deaths

See also
 1994 in British music
 1994 in British radio
 1994 in the United Kingdom
 List of British films of 1994

References